Seyid Abulgasim Nabati (1812–1873) was a 19th-century Iranian Azerbaijani poet.

His life remained very little information that is not even accurate information as to the people to which he belonged. We only know that Nabati graduated from high school the spiritual, spent his youth in Arasbaran, later visited the tomb of Sheikh Shahabaddin in Ahar, after which he returned to his native Ushtibin, where he lived until his death. After the death of his poems, not all of which were published during his lifetime, or even recorded, performed by locals as the song.

He wrote in Azerbaijani and Persian. His first poem was published in Tabriz in 1845. Nabati poem written in Azerbaijani as quantitative metric ( araz ) and syllabic People, among his heritage present as Ruban, and gazal, dedicated to the chanting of the beauties of nature, human love, appeals to enjoy the pleasures of life. Nabati also wrote poetry and philosophy, in which the important place occupied topic pantheism, although this part of his legacy is controversial : some of his works can be seen or Sufi mystic, some - even atheistic sentiments. In the poetic heritage Nabati feel the influence of classical models as Eastern poetry, and folk art. The form of his poetry had some influence on the development of ashug verse.

Notes

 Seyid Abulgasim Nabati
 Arif, M. Istoriia azerbaidzhanskoi literatury. Baku, 1971.
 Qasımzadə, F. XIX əsr Azərbaycan ədəbiyyatı tarixi. Baku, 1966.

1812 births
People from East Azerbaijan Province
1873 deaths
Iranian male poets
Azerbaijani-language poets
19th-century Iranian poets
Iranian atheists
Azerbaijani atheists